Frontism may stand for:
 Common front, the political practice (both left and right wing) of uniting with anyone against a common enemy
 Frontist Party, a left-wing French political party in the 1930s
 Frontpartij, a Flemish nationalist movement in Belgium in the 1920s
 National Front (Switzerland), a fascist Swiss party in the 1930s